The 1980–81 DePaul Blue Demons men's basketball team represented DePaul University during the 1980–81 NCAA Division I men's basketball season. They were led by head coach Ray Meyer, in his 39th season, and played their home games at the brand new Rosemont Horizon in Rosemont.

Roster

Schedule and results

|-
!colspan=12 style=| Regular season

|-
!colspan=12 style=| NCAA Tournament

Source:

Rankings

Team players drafted into the NBA

References 

DePaul
1980 in sports in Illinois
DePaul Blue Demons men's basketball seasons
1981 in sports in Illinois
DePaul